Stormtroopers of Death (abbreviated to S.O.D.) was an American crossover thrash band formed in New York City in 1985. They are credited as being among the first bands to fuse hardcore punk with thrash metal into a style sometimes referred to as crossover thrash. The band is also known for reuniting Anthrax members Scott Ian (guitars) and Charlie Benante (drums) with their former bassist Dan Lilker. Their instrumental song "March of the SOD" from their 1985 debut album, Speak English or Die, was the Headbangers Ball intro anthem for many years. Another song from the same album, "Chromatic Death", was also used during the show as a segue between ads and videos.

The band was the source of some controversy due to their deliberately offensive lyrics. Scott Ian described the songs on Speak English Or Die as "ridiculous" and "just a big inside joke", adding: "Some people thought we were racist, and those people are stupid." Bassist Dan Lilker stated: "The lyrics were never intended to be serious, just to piss people off." The band had several periods of inactivity following their formation in 1985. According to singer Billy Milano, the 24-song extended play of live and unreleased material called Rise of the Infidels, released in August 2007 on Megaforce Records, "will finally be the last of S.O.D.", laying to rest rumors of another reunion.

History

Speak English or Die and first hiatus (1985–1991)
After finishing his guitar tracks on the Anthrax album Spreading the Disease, Scott Ian would draw pictures of a character known as "Sargent D." The pictures would be accompanied by slogans such as "I'm not racist; I hate everyone" and "Speak English or Die", and Ian would write lyrics about the character. He decided to form a hardcore band based on Sargent D, so he recruited Anthrax drummer Charlie Benante, ex-Anthrax bassist Dan Lilker, and Psychos bassist Billy Milano on vocals.

They recorded a 63-song demo called Crab Society North and set to work on an album for Johnny Zazula's Megaforce Records. The album, titled Speak English or Die, was recorded and mixed over three days, and has since been hailed as a landmark album that was among the first to fuse hardcore punk with thrash metal. They toured in support of the album in 1985, opening for Motörhead and The Plasmatics, among others. Their music served as the theme of the 1980s incarnation of MTV's Headbangers Ball. They planned a follow-up titled USA For S.O.D., which was ultimately scrapped and never recorded.

After their tour ended, Lilker carried on with the band Nuclear Assault while Benante and Ian continued with Anthrax. Milano formed the spin-off band Method of Destruction, known as M.O.D. The band's first album U.S.A. for M.O.D., featured many lyrics written by Scott Ian, as well as an altered version of "Aren't You Hungry", an unrecorded S.O.D. song played during their 1985 tour.

Reunions and Bigger Than the Devil (1992–2002)
S.O.D. reformed for a one-off gig in New York City in 1992, which was recorded and released as the live album Live at Budokan. The record featured most songs from the Speak English or Die album, a few songs from the demo and covers of Ministry, Nirvana and Fear. In 1997, S.O.D. reunited again to play the Milwaukee Metal Fest. They played their first European gig at the With Full Force festival in Germany, and in 1999 they released their second studio album, titled Bigger Than the Devil. Its hardcore metal and black humor was welcomed by fans and the band toured again in the late 1990s. Bigger Than the Devil featured the original S.O.D. version of "Aren't You Hungry".

In 2001, the DVD/video Speak English or Live was released. It added to the original Live at Budokan video by including a gig from a German metal festival and footage of the band recording overdubs for live tracks recorded in Japan. These would be included on the platinum reissue of Speak English or Die, along with two new studio tracks, to celebrate one million copies of Speak English or Die sold. In 2002, the concert film Kill Yourself: The Movie was released on DVD.

Second breakup and subsequent activities (2003–present)
Heavy metal news outlets reported in 2003 that the band had split up due to disagreements between Ian and Milano. In 2007, however, S.O.D. reconvened and released its third album, Rise of the Infidels. The album consists of previously unrecorded material and live recordings. However, Milano said that the album would be the band's final release.

In October 2011, Scott Ian was asked by UnRatd Magazine if there was any chance of another reunion, to which he replied: 

In December 2012, it was announced that Billy Milano and Dan Lilker had reunited in a new band called United Forces.

In July 2015, Horns Up Rocks reported that S.O.D. would reunite again in celebration of their 30th anniversary. However, bassist Dan Lilker said that there were no plans for an S.O.D. reunion, and added that Billy Milano did not "consult anybody else that played in S.O.D. He just kind of announced something."

In 2017, Lilker formed a new version of S.O.D. under the name Not S.O.D. – Fist Banging Maniacs, with Brazilian musicians João Gordo, Cléber Orsioli and Guilherme Cersosimo filling in for Milano, Ian and Benante respectively.

In April 2020, Benante posted video of himself along with Ian and Lilker on YouTube performing S.O.D. songs during the COVID-19 lockdown.

In May 2020, Benante, Ian and Lilker, along with Mike Patton on vocals, posted a video on YouTube of "Speak Spanish or Die".

Members
 Scott Ian – guitar, backing vocals
 Dan Lilker – bass, backing vocals
 Charlie Benante – drums, additional guitar solos
 Billy Milano – lead vocals

Discography

Studio albums
Speak English or Die (1985)
Bigger than the Devil (1999)
Rise of the Infidels (2007)

Live albums
Live at Budokan (1992)

Singles
 "March of the S.O.D." (1985)
 "Seasoning the Obese" (1999)

Other appearances
 From the Megavault (1985)
 Deeper into the Vault (1991)
 Crossover (1993)
 Stars on Thrash (1998)
 Suburban Open Air '99 (1999)
 Death Is Just the Beginning, Vol. 5 (1999)
 Dynamit Vol. 16 (1999)
 Nuclear Blast Soundcheck Series, Vol. 18 (1999)
 A Tribute to the Scorpions (2000)
 Death Is Just the Beginning, Vol. 6 (2000)
 New York's Hardest, Vol. 3 (2001)
 Death Is Just the Beginning, Vol. 7 (2002)

Videos

References

External links

 S.O.D. & M.O.D. fan site

American thrash metal musical groups
Crossover thrash groups
Musical groups established in 1985
Obscenity controversies in music
Heavy metal musical groups from New York (state)
Nuclear Blast artists
Hardcore punk groups from New York (state)
1985 establishments in New York City